Burnside is an unincorporated community in Pilot Grove Township, Hancock County, Illinois, United States.

History
Burnside was founded in 1862, and named after Ambrose Everett Burnside, a railroad official.

Geography

References

Unincorporated communities in Illinois
Unincorporated communities in Hancock County, Illinois